Chong King Kong (born 22 April 1971) is a former Malaysian footballer.

Club career
King Kong played for Penang.

International career

Youth
King Kong represented Malaysia at under-19 level in qualification games for the 1988 AFC Youth Championship, before scoring in an under-21 fixture against Hong Kong in 1990. He represented the Malaysia national under-23 football team at the 1990 Indonesian Independence Cup, the 1991 Merdeka Tournament and qualification games for the 1992 Summer Olympics, scoring three times against The Philippines in two separate games.

He also represented the Malaysia 'B' team at the 1994 Dunhill Cup, scoring once against the Denmark under-21 side.

Senior
King Kong made two appearances for Malaysia in 1994, both in the 1994 Asian Games. He was sent home disgraced from the tournament due to his part in the 1994 Malaysian football scandal.

Career statistics

International

References

1971 births
Malaysian footballers
Malaysia international footballers
Association football defenders
Association football forwards
Penang F.C. players
Living people